is a private university in Sendai, Miyagi, Japan, established in 1964.

External links
  

Educational institutions established in 1964
Private universities and colleges in Japan
Universities and colleges in Miyagi Prefecture
Engineering universities and colleges in Japan
Buildings and structures in Sendai
1964 establishments in Japan